The fourth Gospel Music Association (GMA) Music Awards were held in 1972 for accomplishments of musicians for the year 1972.

Background
An indication that gospel music was fast approaching professionalism was a bona fide scandal over GMA's 1971 Dove Awards. The incident involved one of gospel music's premier groups, The Blackwood Brothers, who had captured nine out of fourteen awards. They were accused of having conducted an extensive campaign to enlist new members to the GMA and to encourage members to vote for particular award nominees in the Dove Award balloting. Though no specific bylaw of the organization had been broken, the tactic created an industrywide concern over "voting irregularities and ethical ballot influence and solicitation."

The GMA Board voted to nullify the entire process, thereby invalidating all the awards that had been presented at the October 8, 1971, banquet held in Nashville. Also, a committee was formed to adjust the voting process with "safeguards to prevent any future irregularities in Dove Awards balloting."  James Blackwood issued a statement in support of the organization's decision and strongly urged all other participants in the Dove Awards to subscribe and adhere to the code of ethics to be set forth by the Gospel Music Association.

Compilation album
Canaan Records of Waco, Texas, issued a long play album of nominated recordings titled The Gospel Music Association's Dove Awards Nominations for the Gospel Song of 1972 (CAS-9732-LP Stereo). Tracks on the recording are given in this table:

Award recipients
Song of the Year
"The Lighthouse"; Ron Hinson; Journey Music (BMI)
Songwriter of the Year
Bill Gaither
Male Vocalist of the Year
James Blackwood
Female Vocalist of the Year
Sue Chenault
Male Group of the Year 
Oak Ridge Boys
Mixed Group of the Year 
Speer Family
Most Promising New Gospel Talent 
London Parris and the Apostles
Album of the Year 
Light; Oak Ridge Boys; Bob MacKenzie, Heart Warming
Instrumentalist 
Tony Brown
Backliner Notes 
Johnny Cash; Light; Oak Ridge Boys
Cover Photo or Cover Art 
Bill Grine; Street Gospel; Oak Ridge Boys
Graphic Layout and Design 
Ace Lehman; L-O-V-E Love; Blackwood Brothers
Television Program 
Gospel Jubilee, Florida Boys
D.J. of the Year
J. G. Whitfield

External links
https://web.archive.org/web/20111114195042/http://www.doveawards.com/history.php

GMA Dove Awards
1972 music awards
GMA Dove Awards
1972 in American music
GMA